Sentimental Maniacs is a 1994 Italian romantic comedy film. It marked the directorial debut of the actress and voice actress Simona Izzo, who won the David di Donatello for Best New Director. For her performance Monica Scattini won the David di Donatello for Best Supporting Actress, while Alessandro Benvenuti received the Ciak d'oro for Best Supporting Actor.

Cast 

Ricky Tognazzi: Luca
Barbara De Rossi: Mara
Alessandro Benvenuti: Sandro
Monica Scattini: Serena
Veronika Logan: Giusy
Alessandro Giannini: Maurizio
Clelia Rondinella: Claudia
Pat O'Hara: Mamy

References

External links

1994 films
Italian comedy-drama films
1994 comedy-drama films
Films directed by Simona Izzo
1994 directorial debut films
1990s Italian films